Cheringoma may refer to:
 Cheringoma District, a district of Sofala Province in Mozambique
 The Cheringoma Plateau, a coastal plateau which is partly in Cheringoma District.